The High and the Flighty is a 1956  Warner Bros. Merrie Melodies cartoon directed by Robert McKimson and written by Tedd Pierce. The short was released on February 18, 1956, and stars Daffy Duck, Foghorn Leghorn and the Barnyard Dawg.

The title is a parody of the 1954 Warner Bros. Pictures film The High and the Mighty starring John Wayne.

Plot
Daffy Duck is a traveling salesman for the Ace Novelty Company of Walla Walla, Washington, when he witnesses Foghorn Leghorn and the Barnyard Dawg in one of their familiar alternating scraps (Foghorn is seen awakening the dog by lifting him up by the tail and repeatedly slapping his rear end with a board which causes the dog to chase him. The dog goes in pursuit, but reaches a painted white line with a sign that reads "Rope Limit" which causes the dog to be jerked to a stop by the rope around his neck. Foghorn yells "AHH SHADDUP!!!" then takes a rubber ball and stuffs it in the dog's mouth, then punctures the ball with a needle causing the dog to fly away. As Foghorn leaves he walks past a wooden tower with a sign that reads "Don't Look Up". Foghorn looks up anyway and sees the dog perched on the tower holding a watermelon which the dog releases, breaking it over Foghorn's head. The dog's prank prompts Foghorn to contemplate "massive retaliation" against him). Daffy enters with his traveling salesman suitcase of novelty joke items and offers to help Foghorn get back at the dog by selling him a trick bone that is spring-loaded.

As the prank works, Daffy then intervenes to help the dog retaliate against Foghorn with a gift-wrapped corn-on-the-cob that is connected to an electrical wire. Naturally, as Foghorn wants to get back at the dog with an even bigger prank, Daffy sells him something called the Chattanooga Choo Choo where Foghorn plays a gramophone record of steam train sound effects and charges towards the doghouse with a cutout of the front of a steam locomotive, smoking a corn-cob pipe to simulate the train's smoke. This ends up backfiring on Foghorn however, as the dog sees through the guise. He lifts his doghouse so that Foghorn misses, causing the rooster to leave the yard through an open gate and find himself on a nearby railroad track, getting hit by a real train. To make up for the Chattanooga Choo-Choo, Daffy offers to sell Foghorn an elaborate prank called the Pipe Full Of Fun Kit Number 7, which Foghorn purchases. As Foghorn is setting up the trap, he sees the dog setting up the same trap to use against him. Both of them realize that Daffy has been playing them against each other (and enriching himself in the process). Daffy overhears Foghorn and the dog joining forces to pay him back and attempts to flee, but instead falls victim to the Pipe Full O' Fun Kit, whereas Foghorn says "You know, there might, I say, there just might be a market for bottled duck.".

Home media
VHS/DVD - Stars of Space Jam: Daffy Duck 
DVD/Blu-ray - Looney Tunes Platinum Collection: Volume 2

See also
 List of American films of 1956

References

External links

 
 

1956 animated films
1956 short films
1956 films
Merrie Melodies short films
1950s Warner Bros. animated short films
Films scored by Carl Stalling
Films directed by Robert McKimson
Daffy Duck films
Films produced by Edward Selzer
1950s English-language films
Foghorn Leghorn films
Barnyard Dawg films